The Department of North Bengal Development, popularly known as the NBDD, is a West Bengal government department. It is an interior ministry mainly responsible for the administration of the North Bengal's seven districts in West Bengal.

Ministerial Team 
The ministerial team at the NBDD is headed by the Cabinet Minister for North Bengal Development, who may be supported by Ministers of State. Civil servants are assigned to them to manage the ministers' office and ministry.

The current head of the ministry is Udayan Guha while Sabina Yasmin as Minister of State .

List of Ministers
 Goutam Deb (2011-2016)
 Rabindra Nath Ghosh (2016-2021)
 Mamata Banerjee (2021-August 2022)
 Udayan Guha (August 2022 - Incumbent)

References

Government departments of West Bengal